PPSF may refer to:

 Palestinian Popular Struggle Front, a militant Palestinian organisation
 Policía de la Provincia de Santa Fe, an Argentinian police force
 Polyphenylsulfone, a polymer